Timothy Shawn Sherrill (born September 10, 1965) is a former Major League Baseball (MLB) left-handed relief pitcher who played in 18 games for the St. Louis Cardinals during the 1990 and 1991 seasons.

References

1965 births
Living people
St. Louis Cardinals players
People from Harrison, Arkansas
Johnson City Cardinals players
Louisville Redbirds players
Savannah Cardinals players
St. Petersburg Cardinals players
Arkansas Razorbacks baseball players